Pelidnota sumptuosa is a species of beetles of the family Scarabaeidae.

Description
Head, pronotum and elytra are completely shining metallic green.

Distribution
This species occurs in Brazil and Paraguay.

References
 Universal Biological Indexer
 Zipcodezoo
 Charles Leonard Hogue  Latin American Insects and Entomology
Sérgio Roberto Rodrigues, Josani da Silva Falco    Biological aspects of the Pelidnota fulva Blanchard, 1850 (Coleoptera, Scarabaeidae, Rutelinae) 
 Insect Life Forms

Scarabaeidae
Beetles described in 1825